Tosagua is a city of Ecuador, on the river Carrizal, seat of the namesake Tosagua Canton, located in the northwestern part of Manabí Province. Its name comes from the native tribe called The Tosahuas. Founded as a county on January 20, 1984, after approval by Congress and the president of the republic Osvaldo Hurtado Larrea. In the city are the main institutions and organizations Tosagua council. Has an area of 377.40 square kilometers and is the geographical axis of what is known as the northern part of Manabí. It is a prosperous area with outstanding traditional planting and harvesting a variety of nutritious fruits coastal area, such as cocoa, coffee, banana, cassava, maize, among others.

Sources 

World-Gazetteer.com

Populated places in Manabí Province